The Joseph I. Lubin School of Business is the business school of Pace University. The school was established in 1906 as the Pace School of Accountancy to prepare men and women for the CPA exam, and was named after Joseph I. Lubin, an alumnus and benefactor of the school, in 1981.  The school is located at Pace University's campuses in New York City and Westchester County, New York.

Undergraduate programs are offered in New York City and Pleasantville, while graduate programs are offered in New York City and White Plains.

Degree programs

Undergraduate degrees
Lubin offers undergraduate degrees in accounting, finance, general business, taxation, management, international management, management science, marketing, quantitative business analysis, and information systems. Management students can choose to concentrate in the following areas:
business management
entrepreneurship
hospitality and tourism management
human resources management
arts and entertainment management

Graduate degrees
MBA degrees are offered in the following disciplines:
accounting
financial management
investment management
information systems
international business
international economics
management
marketing
taxation
entrepreneurship

MS degrees include:
accounting
customer intelligence and analytics
financial management
risk management
human resources management
investment management
social media and mobile marketing
taxation
information systems
international business

Lubin also offers a Doctor of Professional Studies program.

Rankings
The Lubin School of Business is accredited for both business and accounting programs by the Association to Advance Collegiate Schools of Business, a dual accreditation held by less than two percent of business schools worldwide; however, the Association lost recognition by the Council for Higher Education Accreditation in 2016.

Pace University's Lubin School of Business is ranked No. 99-131 in Best Business Schools, ranked No. 172 in undergraduate Business Programs, and tied for No. 188 in Part-time MBA programs among business programs nationwide by U.S. News & World Report in its 2019 surveys.

Lubin is the second largest private AACSB-accredited business school in the New York metropolitan area and the seventh largest private AACSB-accredited business school in the country.

Bowman's Accounting Report ranked Pace, with 112 partners in the Big Four accounting firms, 17th nationwide among schools with alumni partners in these firms.

Noted alumni and faculty
 Berat Albayrak - former Minister of Finance and Treasury and son-in-law of the President of Turkey
 Herbert L. Henkel - Chairman, Ingersoll-Rand Company; former President & CEO
 Mel Karmazin - former CEO, Sirius Satellite Radio; former President & CEO, CBS; former COO, Viacom
 Ariane de Rothschild - Member of the Board of Directors, Edmond de Rothschild Group
 Ivan G. Seidenberg - former President & CEO, Verizon
 Michael Bevilacqua - former member of the Soprano Crime Family in the fictionalized TV show. (needs citation)

References

External links
 Lubin School of Business
 Pace University

Pace University
Business schools in New York (state)
Educational institutions established in 1906
Universities and colleges in Westchester County, New York
1906 establishments in New York (state)
Universities and colleges in New York City